The Cincinnati Marlins are a non-profit, USA Swimming–affiliated swim team based in Cincinnati, Ohio, United States serving Cincinnati and Northern Kentucky. Founded in 1961, the team competes at the elementary school, high school, and college levels.

The Marlins operate three training facilities: Northern Kentucky University using the NKU Campus Recreation Center, Five Seasons Sports Club, and its headquarters at Keating Natatorium on the campus of St. Xavier High School in Finneytown, Ohio. The organization was designated a Gold Medal Club by USA Swimming 2006 - 2008  but no longer has that recognition. It is designated a Level 4 club, which is the highest level attainable in the USA Swimming's Club Recognition Program in 2008.

Facilities
Keating Natatorium at St. Xavier High School is a 50-meter indoor facility which can be divided into two 25-yard pools.  Keating has seating capacity for over 700 spectators and is the site of many USA Swimming and High School meets and championships. Marlins Central swimmers train at this facility.

Marlins South swimmers train at Northern Kentucky University using the Campus Recreation Center.

History
The Cincinnati Marlins swim team was founded in 1961.  Eighty-nine girls were selected for the team the first year, with seventy-seven boys joining the following year.  For many years the team was known as the Cincinnati "Pepsi" Marlins, in recognition of the Pepsi-Cola Company's initial donation of $ to the team. In their first decade, the Marlins practiced at Aiken and Courter Technical high schools, but these borrowed facilities could not accommodate the team as it grew to more than 200 swimmers. Their current home facility, Keating Natatorium, was built in 1969.  It is named after Charles Keating, Sr. The Marlins and Keating Natatorium host approximately 20 swimming competitions a year.

The Marlins have placed a swimmer on every Olympic Team from 1968 - 2004.  Team members have broken numerous National Record and World Records.  In 1980 the team captured the United States National Championship.  That year, six Marlins’ swimmers were named to the U.S. Olympic team, more than from any other team.  The Olympic tradition carries on to today where two Marlins represented the United States in the 2000 Sydney Olympics and the 2004 Athens Olympics. Six former Marlins coaches have been named to Olympic Coaching Staffs. The team was named Junior National Team Champions in 1983, 84, 97,98,99, and 2000.  In 2005, the Men’s team placed first, the combined team second.  Swimming World Magazine named the Cincinnati Marlins 1999’s Best Age-Group Team in America.

Significant achievements include: 
·         1980 National Team Champions
·         23 Olympic Medals
·         15 World Records
·         19 American Records
·         60 National Champions
·         6 American Swimmers of the Year

Notable alumni
The Marlins have been home to many accomplished swimmers, including 25 Olympic qualifiers. Together, they have won 23 Olympic medals.

Lisa Buese – silver medalist at the 1979 Pan American Games
Deena Deardurff – gold medalist at the 1972 Summer Olympics and silver medalist at the 1973 World Aquatics Championships
Nate Dusing – silver medalist at the 2000 Sydney Summer Olympics and bronze medalist at the 2004 Athens Summer Olympics
Stephanie Elkins – gold medalist at the 1978 World Aquatics Championships and 1979 Pan American Games
Jerry Frentsos – gold medalist at the 1987 Pan American Games
Gary Hall, Sr. – silver medalist at the 1968 Mexico City and 1972 Munich Summer Olympics and bronze medalist at the 1976 Montreal Summer Olympics
Paul Hove – bronze medalist at the 1975 World Aquatics Championships
Joe Hudepohl – gold medalist at the 1992 Barcelona and 1996 Atlanta Summer Olympics
Charles Keating, Jr. – 1946 NCAA swimming champion
Jennifer Kemp - 1972 Olympic gold medalist
Dan Ketchum – gold medalist at the 2004 Athens Summer Olympics
Mary T. Meagher – gold medalist at the 1984 Los Angeles Summer Olympics and bronze medalist at the 1988 Seoul Summer Olympics
Betsy Mitchell – silver medalist at the 1984 Los Angeles and 1988 Seoul Summer Olympics
Erin Phenix – gold medalist at the 2000 Sydney Summer Olympics and silver medalist at the 2001 World Aquatics Championships
Kim Rhodenbaugh – silver medalist at the 1982 World Aquatics Championships and bronze medalist at the 1983 Pan American Games
Dave Wilson – gold medalist at the 1984 Los Angeles Summer Olympics

Notable staff
Skip Kenney (1977–79) – head swimming coach, Stanford Cardinal, and inductee to the International Swimming Hall of Fame

References

External links
Cincinnati Marlins official website
USA Swimming official website
Ohio Swimming official website

Swim teams in the United States
Sports teams in Cincinnati
Non-profit organizations based in Cincinnati
Sports clubs established in 1961
St. Xavier High School (Ohio)
1961 establishments in Ohio